The Monks Kirby Rural District was a rural district of Warwickshire between 1894 and 1932, based on the part of the Lutterworth Rural Sanitary District which was in Warwickshire.  Its council was based in the village of Monks Kirby.

The district consisted of six civil parishes of

Copston Magna 
Monks Kirby 
Pailton
Stretton-under-Fosse 
Wibtoft 
Willey

Due to its small size (its population was recorded as 1,456 in 1931) the district was abolished in 1932 and merged into the Rugby Rural District, under the review caused by the Local Government Act 1929. The area is now part of the present borough of Rugby.

References
Monks Kirby Rural District – From visionofbritain.org.uk.

History of Warwickshire
Local government in Warwickshire
Districts of England created by the Local Government Act 1894
Rural districts of England